MTV Ace of Space is an Indian reality competition television series that airs on MTV India. Created and hosted by Vikas Gupta, it premiered on 20 October 2018.

Series

Season 1

Ace of Space 1 is the first season of Indian reality competition television series, MTV Ace of Space. Hosted by Vikas Gupta, it aired from 20 October 2018 to 31 December 2018 on MTV India. After 71 days, Divya Agarwal emerged as the winner of the season.

Contestants
 Divya Agarwal | Winner
 Pratik Sehajpal | Runner Up
 Varun Sood | Second Runner Up
 Shehzad Deol| 3rd Runner Up
 Faisal Khan| 4th Runner Up
 Miesha Iyer|5th Runner Up
 Fizah Khan(Evicted: Day 57) (Re–Entered: Day 58)(Re–Evicted: Day 69)
 Abhiraj Chadha(Evicted: Day 63)
 Chetna Pande(Evicted: Day 58)
 Omprakash Mishra(Evicted: Day 22) (Re–Entered: Day 31)(Re–Evicted: Day 50)
 Danish Zehen(Left, Emergency: Day 43)
 Riya Subodh(Evicted: Day 43)
 Sambhav Sharma(Evicted: Day 22) (Re–Entered: Day 31)(Left, Family Issue: Day 40)
 Sankalp Sharma(Evicted: Day 22) (Re–Entered: Day 31)(Left, Family Issue: Day 40)
 Akanksha Sharma(Evicted: Day 35)
 Kamz(Evicted: Day 29)
 Nadia Sheikh(Evicted: Day 23)
 Pooja Rathi(Evicted: Day 15)
 Deepak Tuteja(Evicted: Day 8)
 Tenzin Mariko(Left, Health Issue: Day 5)

Season 2

Ace of Space 2 is the second season of Indian reality competition television series, MTV Ace of Space. Hosted by Vikas Gupta, it aired from 24 August 2019 to 3 November 2019 on MTV India. After 72 days, Salman Zaidi was declared as the winner.

Contestants
 Salman Zaidi | Winner
 Adnaan Shaikh | Runner Up
 Baseer Ali | Second Runner Up
 Shruti Sinha| 3rd Runner up
 Krissann Barretto(Evicted: Day 72)
 Prakruti Mishra(Evicted: Day 72)
 Rashmi Jha(Evicted: Day 72)
 Deepak Thakur(Left, Health Issue: Day 7)(Re–Entered: Day 27) (Evicted: Day 67)
 Khushali Vyas(Evicted: Day 67)
 Yash Rajput(Walked: Day 67)
 Lucinda Nicholas(Evicted: Day 65)
 Khushi Chaudhary(Evicted: Day 65)
 Manhar Seth(Evicted: Day 51)
 Luv Tyagi(Quit: Day 51)
 Nikita Bhamidipati(Evicted: Day 40)
 Mandeep Gujjar(Evicted: Day 40)
 Ramiz King(Evicted: Day 37)
 Pearl Almeida(Evicted: Day 37)
 Ohm Kaliraman(Evicted: Day 32)
 Akshay Kakkar(Evicted: Day 26)
 Renu Bhati(Evicted: Day 20)
 Nasir Khan(Quit: Day 13)
 Roshni Misbah(Evicted: Day 13)
 Rohit Singh Rajput(Evicted: Day 7)

Production

Season 1
On 5 October 2018, Vikas Gupta released the first promo of Ace of Space 1.
 
Eighteen contestants fought it out in six rooms to win the audiences' hearts and space in the house. They had to perform difficult tasks to ensure survival. After 71 days, the contestant with the highest votes and space walked away with the title of Ace of Space.

Season 2
On 3 August 2019, Vikas Gupta shared the first promo of Ace of Space 2.

Eighteen contestants were divided into two sections: Team Kings, who had access to luxuries and Team Jacks, who did not have access to even basic necessities. They had to perform tasks and manage survival for 72 days. Coupled with this, the season had an enhanced digital interaction.

Ace of Quarantine 
A spin-off series Ace of Quarantine, hosted by Divya Aggarwal and Varun Sood was launched on 12 July 2020.

References

External links

 Official Website

MTV (Indian TV channel) original programming
2018 Indian television series debuts
Indian reality television series
Hindi-language television shows
Television shows set in Mumbai